Wasco is the name of four places in the United States:

Places

United States
 Wasco, California, a city in California
 Wasco State Prison, located in Wasco, California
 Wasco, Illinois, a former hamlet (unincorporated town) in Illinois, now part of Campton Hills
 Wasco, Oregon, a city in Oregon
 Wasco County, Oregon, a county in Oregon

Chile
 Wasco a city in Chile
 Wasco a province in Chile

Native American
Wasco may also mean:
 Wasco-Wishram, two Native American tribes from Oregon
 Wasco-Wishram language, a dialect of Upper Chinook, a Chinookan language

Companies
Wasco Energy, an oil and gas service company specializing in pipeline coatings